Servilia (the name of a main character), is an opera in five acts by Nikolai Rimsky-Korsakov. The work was completed in 1901, and was first performed in 1902 in St. Petersburg, Russia. The composer wrote the libretto, which is based on the drama by Lev Alexandrovich Mey. The story is set in Ancient Rome during Nero's reign.

Performance history
The world premiere took place in St. Petersburg on 14 October (O.S. / 1 October) 1902 at the Mariinsky Theatre.  It was the only one of Rimsky's late operas not performed in Mamontov's private theatre - conducted by Feliks Blumenfeld. A second performance took place in 1904, and a third in 1944. An LP of extracts from Act 3 scene 5 and Acts 4 scenes 5 and 6 was recorded in 1951 under Onisim Bron with Olga Piotrovskaya in the role of Servilia, Georgi Nelepp as Valery and Pavel Lisitsian as Egnaty. Only one aria, the Act 3 "my flowers" aria of Servilia («Цветы мои, и вы в палящий полдень»), has survived in the concert repertoire, and was recently recorded in 2006 by Renée Fleming for a Decca recital under Valery Gergiev.

Synopsis
Servilia, daughter of the senator Soranus, is desired by her father to contract an alliance with Trasea, but the latter, hearing of her preference for his adopted son Valerius, withdraws his suit. Egnatius, the freedman of Soranus, being enamoured of Servilia, conspires against his master and Trasea, and intimates to Servilia that her submission alone will secure their safety. Valerius has mysteriously disappeared, and Servilia, becoming a convert to Christianity, renounces the World. Called before the tribunal, Trasea and Soranus are sentenced to banishment, while Servilia is awarded to Egnatius. Valerius now returns, bearing a proclamation from Nero that the tribunal is dissolved. The sudden reappearance of her lover causes Servilia's death, and Valerius is only prevented from destroying himself by the intervention of his foster-father. Egnatius, in his woe, invokes the Divine Being, and the rest join him in acclaiming the Christian God.

References

Sources
 
 Holden, Amanda (Ed.), The New Penguin Opera Guide, New York: Penguin Putnam, 2001. 
 
 

Operas by Nikolai Rimsky-Korsakov
Russian-language operas
Operas
1902 operas
Operas based on plays
Operas set in Italy
Operas set in ancient Rome